Barry Hugh Williams (born 6 January 1974 in Carmarthen, Carmarthenshire) is a Welsh international rugby union player. He played hooker. In 1997, he toured South Africa with the British & Irish Lions and at the time played club rugby for Neath RFC.

He has previously played for Llandovery RFC, Llanelli RFC, Neath RFC, Richmond RFC, Bristol, Swansea and the Ospreys He is the current coach of Llandeilo RFC. It has been announced that he will be Head Coach at Llangennech RFC for the 2010/11 season.

References

External links
Ospreys profile
Wales profile
Lions profile
Williams ends Test career

1974 births
Living people
British & Irish Lions rugby union players from Wales
Llandovery RFC players
Llanelli RFC players
Neath RFC players
Ospreys (rugby union) players
Rugby union hookers
Rugby union players from Carmarthen
Swansea RFC players
Wales international rugby union players
Welsh rugby union players
Richmond F.C. players